Molok may refer to:

 Tiddalik the frog
 Molok, Iran
 Molok, album by Gazpacho
 Molok, finnish company
 Moloch, an ancient Canaanite god

See also
Moloch (disambiguation)